Shush (also Romanized as Shūsh, Shoosh, and by name of the ancient nearby city: Sūsa) is a city and capital of Shush County, Khuzestan Province, Iran.  At the 2006 census, its population was 53,897, in 10,689 families.  Shush is located beside ancient Susa.

References

Populated places in Shush County

Cities in Khuzestan Province
Susa